, previously known as , is a Japanese musician, songwriter, entertainer, journalist, sumo commentator, actor and voice actor. He first gained fame in the 1980s as vocalist of the heavy metal band Seikima-II, before starting a solo career in 1990 and branching out into other forms of entertainment. His real name is not publicly known and he is noted for always working entirely in character, which includes wearing face paint.

Early life and education 
Demon attended kindergarten up through his first year of elementary school in New York City. He moved to Tokyo for second grade of elementary school, before moving to Nishi-ku, Hiroshima in 1971 for three years. Returning to Tokyo, Demon grew up there from 6th grade on.

Between 1982 and 1983, Demon attended an acting school in Tokyo.

In March 1986, Demon graduated with honors from Waseda University with a degree in social science. A fan of sumo since childhood, he was a member of the university's sumo club. He was also a member of their folk song club.

Career

Music  
When Sunplaza Nakano-kun left the Waseda University rock band Super Slump to form Bakufu Slump, Demon replaced him as vocalist.

Demon and fellow Waseda University student Damian Hamada formed the heavy metal band Seikima-II in December 1982. The band saw numerous lineup changes in their career, with Demon being the only constant member. They signed to CBS/Sony and released their first album Seikima II – Akuma ga Kitarite Heavy Metal in 1985. Seikima-II went on to release 12 studio albums and sell over 10 million records. In accordance to their fictional "prophecy" and after completing their "world conquest", Seikima-II disbanded at the end of the century on December 31, 1999 at 23:59:59. They have held various limited time reunions since 2005, and released their first album of new material in 23 years in 2022.

Demon released his first solo album in 1990, and after Seikima-II disbanded focused on his solo career.

In 1994, Demon appeared on Larry King Live, becoming the first Japanese musician to do so.

In January 2007, Demon released Girls' Rock, a cover album of rock songs by female artists. He released a follow-up, Girls' Rock √ Hakurai, in January 2008 and supported it with a national tour from April to May. A third female rock cover album, Girls' Rock ~Tiara~, was released on February 11, 2009. The compilation album Girls' Rock Best, collecting songs from these three albums and some new covers, was released on January 20, 2010.

Demon released Mythology, his first original studio album in nine years, on May 16, 2012. It features several guests, including Yuki Koyanagi and May J., and a song composed by Tetsuya Komuro. The album's June tour featured Koyanagi at every date, while its final day also saw the other contributors perform.

Demon wrote and composed the 2013 song  for the idol group Kamen Rider Girls.

For his March 2017 album Existence, Demon had two Akutagawa Prize winning authors (Keisuke Hada and Yū Nagashima) and Terra Formars author Yū Sasuga write song lyrics. His November 2017 album Utadama was built around folk instruments, pianos and other unplugged instruments and includes covers of songs such as "Furusato" and "Kimigayo".

His November 2019 album Uta Dokuro: Gekida☆Shinkansen Gekichūka-shū is a collaboration with the theater company Gekida☆Shinkansen, with whom he has written lyrics for and performed songs with since at least 1995. The album features Demon singing 12 songs he wrote for the company's plays over the last 24 years with some altered lyrics.

Demon collaborated with Arika Takarano (Ali Project) for the May 13, 2020 single , which is the opening theme of the anime adaptation of The 8th Son? Are You Kidding Me?. That same year, he provided the song "Naked Men Miro, Hadaka no Oretachi o!" to the stage adaptation of Reiko Okano's sumo manga series Ryōgoku Hananishiki Tōshi.

Sumo 
Demon dedicated a section of his radio program Demon Kogure no All Night Nippon to sumo. The section, called , often featured interviews with active rikishi, most notably Daitetsu Tadamitsu, who became friends with Demon.

Demon wrote a column for the sumo magazine Van Van Sumo Club for 13 years, and was a regular guest commentator on the J Sports TV show Gekisen! Ōzumō for five years. But he was asked not to enter the Ryōgoku Kokugikan in costume so as not to cause a distraction, and complied. However, in 2005 Demon was asked by the Japan Sumo Association to be a guest on Dosukoi FM, the live in-house radio broadcast of sumo tournaments, and to come in costume, ending the ban.

The following year Demon was a guest commentator for NHK's television broadcast of the January 2006 honbasho, and became the first guest to commentate an entire sumo tournament.

Demon was a guest commentator on day 8 of the January 2009 tournament alongside his close friend and former yokozuna Hiroshi Wajima. When Wajima died in December 2018, Demon sang a song he wrote at the funeral and was a pallbearer.

On day 2 of the January 2011 tournament Demon caused some controversy when he opined publicly on NHK that Kotomitsuki Keiji, who was expelled by the JSA in July 2010 for gambling, should be reinstated.

In April 2012, Demon's alma mater Waseda University appointed him a special counselor of their sumo club which was struggling to recruit new members.

Other activities 

Demon hosted the weekly radio program  on Mondays from 25:00 to 27:00 (technically Tuesday mornings) on National Radio Network from April 6, 1987 to May 14, 1990 as part of All Night Nippon.

In 2008, Demon wrote, directed and acted in the short film .

Demon voiced the character Zatan in the 2012 Kamen Rider × Kamen Rider Wizard & Fourze: Movie War Ultimatum film. He also wrote and performed its theme song, "Forest of Rocks".

In 2017, Demon was selected by the Ministry of Internal Affairs and Communications to educate the public on and bring awareness to the harm of illegal radio waves.

In February 2018, Demon took part in a symposium alongside singer Kaori Kishitani, athlete Dai Tamesue and the representative director of the Federation of Music Producers Japan speaking on the problem of ticket scalping. That year Demon provided the voice of the character Dr. Tetsuji Kanie in the anime adaptation of Hinomaru Sumo.

In 2019, Demon was appointed an ambassador for good medical care by the Ministry of Health, Labour and Welfare.

Demon leant his voice to Capcom's 2023 video game Street Fighter 6 as a real time commentator for fights.

Persona 

Like the other members of Seikima-II, Demon adopted the stage persona of an Akuma ("demon") from the futuristic hyper-evolved dimension Makai ("demon world"), where he was the former Vice Emperor. They all wear face paint and elaborate stage outfits. The band preaches a demonic religion called Akumakyō through heavy metal music to conquer the Earth. Originally using the name , he began using  in 2000, and in 2010 changed his name to Demon Kakka. He has also released material under the name  and the symbol !, which is read as "Exclamation".

On December 10, 2014, a supporter of politician Daisuke Sakamoto (Party for Japanese Kokoro) dressed as Demon during a public event supporting Sakamoto in the 2014 Japanese general election to represent Hiroshima 7th district. When news of the cosplay spread on the internet and TV, Demon wrote a blog post stating that because it was not made clear that it was a fake, any similar acts in the future would result in legal action. Sakamoto apologized stating that it was a "careless" decision.

Discography

Studio albums

Singles

Compilation albums

Home videos

Other work

Video games

Filmography 

2005 Jack's Big Music Show Jack

Bibliography

References

External links 

 
 Official English website
 Official blog
 

Japanese heavy metal singers
Japanese male pop singers
Japanese television personalities
Japanese male voice actors
Japanese writers
Japanese film directors
Sports commentators
Avex Group artists
1962 births
Living people
Unidentified musicians
Musicians from Shibuya
20th-century Japanese male actors
21st-century Japanese male actors
English-language singers from Japan
Waseda University alumni
Musicians with fictional stage personas
Sumo people